"Songbird" is a song sung by Swedish singer-songwriter Ellen Benediktson and written by Sharon Vaughn, Johan Fransson, Tim Larsson and Tobias Lundgren. The song is best known for being performed by Benediktson at Melodifestivalen 2014. It qualified for the final from the first semifinal held in Malmö placing second out of eight. In the final, the song placed seventh out of ten.

On 6 April 2014, the song entered Svensktoppen.

Charts

Weekly charts

References

2014 singles
Melodifestivalen songs of 2014
Pop ballads
Songs written by Sharon Vaughn
Songs written by Johan Fransson (songwriter)
Songs written by Tim Larsson
Songs written by Tobias Lundgren
Warner Music Group singles
2014 songs